The 2017–18 Liga Națională was the 60th season of Liga Națională, the top-level women's professional handball league. The league comprises 14 teams. CSM București were the defending champions, for the third season in a row.

Team changes

To Liga Națională
Promoted from Divizia A
 Rapid București
 CSM Slatina

From Liga Națională
Relegated to Divizia A
 —

Teams for season 2017–18

League table

Standings

Liga Națională play-offs
The 11th and 12th-placed teams of the Liga Națională faced the 2nd and 3rd-placed teams of the Divizia A, from both Seria A and Seria B. The first place from each play-off group promoted to Liga Națională.

Serie I

Serie II

Season statistics

Number of teams by counties

External links
 Romanian Handball Federaration 

Liga Națională (women's handball)
2017 in Romanian women's sport
2018 in Romanian women's sport
2017–18 domestic handball leagues